The Albertane Tour was the debut tour by American band, Hanson. The tour supported the band's debut studio album, Middle of Nowhere (1997). The tour predominantly visited North America with additional dates in France, Germany and England. The Live from Albertane album was released the following fall to capture performances on the tour. The documentary film The Road to Albertane was also made to record the touring experience for the three Hanson brothers.

Opening act
Admiral Twin 
Baha Men 
John Popper

Setlist
The following setlist was obtained from the June 29, 1998 concert, held at the Pine Knob Music Theatre in Clarkston, Michigan. It does not represent all concerts for the duration of the tour.

"Gimme Some Lovin'" / "Shake a Tail Feather"
"Thinking of You"
"Where's the Love"
"River"
"Madeline"
"Weird"
"Sometimes"
"Stories"
"With You in Your Dreams"
"Soldier"
"More Than Anything" 
"Speechless"
"Ever Lonely"
"Money (That's What I Want)"
"I Will Come to You"
"Good Lovin'"
"MMMBop"
"Man from Milwaukee"
Encore
"Look at You"
"Summertime Blues"

Tour dates

Documentary
The Road to Albertane, released on VHS in 1998, documented the tour, compiling clips from their live concerts, interviews, and interactions with fans.

External links
 Fan Reviews
 Fan testimonial about Mansfield date
 all tour dates and images of tickets

References

1998 concert tours
Hanson (band)